João de Sahagún, O.A.D. (1668–1730) was a Roman Catholic prelate who served as Bishop of São Tomé e Príncipe (1709–1730).

Biography
João de Sahagún was born in Melres, Portugal on 9 Apr 1668 and ordained a priest in the Order of Discalced Augustinians.
On 22 Jul 1709, he was appointed during the papacy of Pope Clement XI as Bishop of São Tomé e Príncipe.
In 1710, he was consecrated bishop. 
He served as Bishop of São Tomé e Príncipe until his death on 12 Oct 1730.

References 

18th-century Roman Catholic bishops in São Tomé and Príncipe
Bishops appointed by Pope Clement XI
1668 births
1730 deaths
People from Gondomar, Portugal
Discalced Augustinian bishops
Portuguese Roman Catholic bishops in Africa
Roman Catholic bishops of São Tomé and Príncipe